Shane Patrick Conlan (born March 4, 1964) is a former professional American football player. He played college football at Penn State University, where he won two national championships in 1982 and 1986, although he was red-shirted prior to the start of the 1982 season and did not play that season. In 1981, prior to his Penn State career and after his senior season at Frewsburg High School in which he played under head coach Thomas Sharp, Conlan was voted Western New York high school Player of the Year. During his career at Penn State, Conlan had 274 tackles, including a school-record 186 solos. He finished his football career as a three-time all-pro with the NFL's Buffalo Bills and the Los Angeles/St. Louis Rams.

Early life
Conlan was born in Olean, New York and was raised in Frewsburg, New York.

College career
Conlan capped his junior season at Penn State in the 1985 national championship game in the Orange Bowl against the University of Oklahoma. The finale to his senior year was in the 1986 national championship game versus the University of Miami in the 1987 Fiesta Bowl, Conlan had eight tackles, two interceptions. Most memorably, he returned the second of his two interceptions 38 yards to the Miami 5-yard line to set up D.J. Dozier's game-winning touchdown. With Penn State's 14–10 victory, Conlan's squad completed an undefeated season, securing the 1986 national championship.

As captain, Conlan led the 1986 squad in tackles with 79, including a team-high 63 solo stops. During his final two collegiate seasons (1985 & 1986), he was named an All-American at outside linebacker, making him the sixth two-time All-American at Penn State. He received this honor from NEA in 1985 and from Walter Camp, The Football News, Football Writers, Football Coaches, Associated Press, United Press International, and College and Pro Football Newsweekly in 1986. In addition, Conlan was a 1986 finalist for the prestigious Butkus Award as the nation's top linebacker. He was elected to the College Football Hall of Fame in 2014.

On December 11, 2014 the Big Ten Network included Conlan on "The Mount Rushmore of Penn State Football", as chosen by online fan voting. Conlan was joined in the honor by John Cappelletti, Jack Ham and LaVar Arrington.

Professional career
Conlan was selected as the No. 1 draft pick of the Buffalo Bills in the 1987 NFL Draft. After his rookie season, he was awarded the 1987 NFL Defensive Rookie of the Year by the Associated Press. From 1988 to 1990, Conlan enjoyed three straight trips to the Pro Bowl. Conlan played with the Bills (1987–92), where he played in the first 3 of the Bills Super Bowl teams and the Los Angeles/St. Louis Rams (1993–95) before retiring from the NFL in 1995.

After football
Since Conlan's retirement from the NFL, he has worked for Esmark Inc. as the company's Vice President of Commercial Real Estate. In 2013, he was named the Pittsburgh Power's Vice President of Corporate Partnerships.

Conlan has four children, including Patrick (b.1992), a former NCAA division III college quarterback (Hobart University), son Chris (b. 1997), an NCAA division I Wide Receiver (William & Mary), and son Dan (b. 2000), an NCAA division I basketball player (Penn State).

References

1964 births
Living people
All-American college football players
American Conference Pro Bowl players
American football linebackers
Buffalo Bills players
Los Angeles Rams players
College Football Hall of Fame inductees
National Football League Defensive Rookie of the Year Award winners
Penn State Nittany Lions football players
People from Frewsburg, New York
St. Louis Rams players